Aki Mitsugi (三津木晶) is a contemporary Japanese artist. She was born in 1987 in Kitakyushu, Fukuoka prefecture. She graduated from the University of Teacher Education Fukuoka with a degree in Elementary School Fine Arts Education. Her paintings are created through unorthodox techniques, like the use of turpentine to remove particular layers of paint.

Exhibitions 
Aki Mitsugi has had her work exhibited at various locations in Japan and has collaborated with artists like Toyomi Kamekawa and Kazutaka Shioi. She has also appeared in various art fairs across Japan.

2018      Infinity Japan Contemporary Art Show 

2018      ART in PARK HOTEL 2018 under Gallery Kazuki 

2018      3331ART FAIR 

2017      Infinity Japan Contemporary Art Show

2017      ART FAIR ASIA FUKUOKA under Gallery MORYTA 

2017      Aki Mitsugi Exhibition Tablecross, GALLERY SOAP, Kitakyushu

2017      Aki Mitsugi Exhibition Tablecross, Gallery MORYTA, Fukuoka

2016      ART SAPPORO under Gallery MORYTA 

2016      ART KAOHSIUNG under Gallery MORYTA 

2016      ART FAIR ASIA FUKUOKA] under Gallery MORYTA 

2016      Aki Mitsugi & Toyomi Kamekawa Exhibition, Gallery Kazuki, Tokyo

2015      ART FAIR ASIA FUKUOKA under Gallery MORYTA

2015      Aki Mitsugi & Toyomi Kamegawa Exhibition, caffe Otto, Fukuoka 

2014      Aki Mitsugi & Toyomi Kamekawa Exhibition, Gallery MORYTA, Fukuoka

2013      Aki Mitsugi Exhibition, Komorebi, Kitakyushu

2012  　  Aki Mitsugi Show, ECRU

2012      Kazutaka Shioi & Aki Mitsugi exhibition, Gallery MORYTA, Fukuoka

2011      PANDEMIC HALATION, GALLERY SOAP, Kitakyushu

2011      Aki Mitsugi Show, SPITAL, Kitakyushu

2011      Aki Mitsugi Show, MOON BEAMS  　

2010      Aki Mitsugi Exhibition, Gallery Canvas

2010　   Kazutaka Shioi & Aki Mitsugi Exhibition, GALLERY CAFFE girasole, Kitakyushu

2009      Aki Mitsugi Exhibition, Gallery Canvas

References

Living people
1987 births
Japanese artists